Yang Jin; ca. (1644-1728) was a Chinese painter during the Qing Dynasty (1644–1912).

Yang was born in Changshu in the Jiangsu province. His style name was 'Zi He' and his pseudonym was 'Xi Ting'. Yang's paintings were meticulous and exquisite, in the style of Wang Hui.

References

Citations

Sources 

 Zhongguo gu dai shu hua jian ding zu. 2000. Zhongguo hui hua quan ji. Zhongguo mei shu fen lei quan ji. Beijing: Wen wu chu ban she. Volume 24.

1644 births
1728 deaths
Qing dynasty painters
Painters from Suzhou
People from Changshu